Nivaiya is a village in the Indian state of Uttar Pradesh. The village is located near to Meja Road and Ramnagar in the Allahabad district. It is located in Meja Tehsil which is next to Manda Tehsil, the former P.M. V.P. Singh's birthplace.

References

Villages in Allahabad district